Everything Was Beautiful is the ninth studio album by Spiritualized, released under Fat Possum Records on April 22, 2022. The album contains influences from psychedelic music, gospel music, and classic rock.

Recording and release
The content of Everything Was Beautiful was taken from the same demo sessions as and serves as a companion piece to the band's previous album, And Nothing Hurt. Put together, both album titles form the quote "Everything Was Beautiful and Nothing Hurt", taken from the 1969 novel Slaughterhouse-Five by Kurt Vonnegut. The album's lead vocalist, Jason Pierce, played 16 different instruments during the album.

The album's first single and music video, "Always Together with You", was released on the 2nd of November 2021; the album's second single and music video, "Crazy", was released on the 10th of January 2022; the album's third and final single and music video, "The Mainline Song", was released on the 7th of March 2022.

Reception

On the review aggregate site Metacritic, Everything Was Beautiful earned a rating of 83 out of 100, based on 23 reviews, indicating "universal acclaim". Aggregator AnyDecentMusic? gave it 8.2 out of 10, based on their assessment of the critical consensus and ranked it the 18th best album of 2022. The album received 4/5 stars from the Observer and 4/5 from the NME. Ben Cardew of Pitchfork gave the album a 7.8/10 and described the album "like meeting an old friend and finding new shared memories." Caleb Campbell writing for Under the Radar gave the album a 9/10 while claiming that there is "immensely evident craftsmanship that runs through the album". AllMusic reviewer Fred Thomas described the album as a "delirious and exciting, a perfect distilment of the best parts of the band's various phases that feels reinvigorated and new" and gave the album a 4.5/5. Writing for The Line of Best Fit, John Amen gave the album 9/10 and concluded, "Everything Was Beautiful shows Spiritualized accessing yet another artistic plateau, forging an exemplary hybridization of unshakeable songs and sublimely assembled music." In Relix, Justin Jacobs notes that Spaceman relies on "many of his old tricks, but the music still comes out sounding fresh and colorful" and writes that "his heady sound feels more vital than ever".

Track listing

References

2022 albums
Spiritualized albums
Bella Union albums
Fat Possum Records albums